Kevin Wolze (born 9 March 1990) is a German former professional footballer who played as a defender.

Career
He joined MSV Duisburg in the summer of 2011, after he spent his youth playing with VfL Wolfsburg and the Bolton Wanderers with his first senior station being the second team of Wolfsburg.

In the season opener of the 2011–12 2. Bundesliga season against the Karlsruher SC, he scored two goals in a 2–3 loss. Those were his first goals in the first or second Bundesliga. The first goal was scored after just 17 seconds which was the third quickest goal in the history of the 2. Bundesliga.

After eight years in Duisburg, Wolze joined VfL Osnabrück for the 2019–20 season.

International
He played at all German youth national teams.

References

External links

1990 births
Living people
People from Wolfsburg
German footballers
Germany youth international footballers
Association football defenders
Association football midfielders
VfL Wolfsburg players
MSV Duisburg players
VfL Osnabrück players
SV 19 Straelen players
2. Bundesliga players
3. Liga players
Regionalliga players
Footballers from Lower Saxony